Dominik Pelivan (born 8 June 1996) is a German-Croatian footballer who plays as a centre back or defensive midfielder for Chemnitzer FC.

References

External links
 

1996 births
Living people
Footballers from Berlin
German people of Croatian descent
Association football defenders
Association football midfielders
German footballers
Croatian footballers
Hertha BSC II players
SG Sonnenhof Großaspach players
FC Energie Cottbus players
Chemnitzer FC players
Regionalliga players
3. Liga players